The 1978–79 Minnesota Golden Gophers men's ice hockey team represented the University of Minnesota in college ice hockey. In its 7th year under head coach Herb Brooks the team compiled a 32–11–1 record and reached the NCAA tournament for the eighth time. The Golden Gophers defeated North Dakota 4–3 in the championship game at the Olympia Stadium in Detroit, Michigan to win their third national championship.

Season

Early lead
Minnesota began the 1978–79 season well, winning two games before each of their losses through mid-November. Steve Janaszak, one of the four remaining players from Minnesota's last national championship team, received the lion's share of minutes in goal as the Gophers built an early lead in both the WCHA and Big Ten. After the calendar had turned to December, Minnesota visited a resurgent North Dakota who had already climbed up to second place in the conference. The teams split the series and Minnesota headed home with an 11–4 record.

The Gophers played host to three ECAC Hockey teams during the winter break and though Harvard gave them a good game, Minnesota swept both weekend to build their record to 15–4. When the Gophers returned to conference play they throttled Michigan with Janaszak posting his only shutout of the season. That dominance likely led to a bit of soft play the following weekend when the Gopher's didn't show up against Minnesota–Duluth and the squad played its first weekend all season without recording a win.

Trouble on the road
After the failed homestand Minnesota spent the following two weekends outside of Minnesota. The first series against Wisconsin began well but the Badgers salvaged a split in the second game. The Gophers then headed southwest to play Denver and lost both games to a middling Pioneer squad. With their conference record dented, Minnesota returned to the Williams Arena and hosted two weak teams over two weeks, easily winning four games, before ending up in Notre Dame where they lost two close affairs. The pair of losses were at an inopportune time because it allowed North Dakota to build a 5-point lead in the WCHA race.

While the two teams would play to end the season Minnesota needed help from a bad Michigan State team who were fighting just to make the conference tournament. Before they could worry about that, however, they had to take care of business at home against Michigan Tech. The Gophers won both of their games and watched as the Fighting Sioux lost on Saturday to give Minnesota a chance at the conference title. The next weekend Minnesota opened with a 5–2 win over North Dakota but could not keep the momentum going and failed to win the crown after losing the second game.

WCHA tournament
With their second-place finish Minnesota was guaranteed home ice for the conference playoffs. After breezing through the first round against Michigan Tech, Minnesota hosted Minnesota–Duluth, one of only two team to have a winning record against the Golden Gophers in the regular season. Minnesota fought valiantly in the first game with Janaszak turning aside all but one shot from a potent Bulldog attack. Minnesota pulled away in the second game, scoring six times, and captured their sixth WCHA tournament title.

NCAA tournament
While the Gophers earned one of the two WCHA bids, the other went to North Dakota and because the Fighting Sioux had finished the regular season with a better conference record, Minnesota was slotted into the second western seed. Because of this Minnesota was forced to begin the tournament against CCHA champion Bowling Green who had proven the year before that they could compete on a national
stage. Minnesota proved the stronger team, however, winning the first round match 6–3 and punching their ticket to Detroit.

In the semifinals Minnesota met New Hampshire, the top offence team in the east, and the two battled a close contest for 60 minutes with the Gophers ending up as the victors. In the championship game Minnesota faced UND for the seventh time that season. The Fighting Sioux elected to start senior Bill Stankoven over freshman Bob Iwabuchi despite the underclassmen's superior numbers. That choice did not pan out as the Gophers scored three times in the first period and took a 2-goal lead into the second. Iwabuchi found himself in goal from the remainder of the contest but the Fighting Sioux had a tough hill to climb. Janaszak played strong throughout the game but couldn't stop North Dakota from cutting into the lead with a late second period goal. Neal Broten restored the two goal advantage less than three minutes into the third but UND narrowed the gap back to 1 with just over ten minutes to play. The two teams fought desperately in the final half-period but neither side was able to score and Minnesota earned their third national title in only 6 years.

Awards and honors
For his superlative play in the three games, Steve Janaszak was named Tournament MOP and was on the All-Tournament Team with teammates Mike Ramsey, Steve Christoff and Eric Strobel. Defenseman Bill Baker was the team's sole representative on the AHCA All-American West Team and the All-WCHA First Team while team scoring leader Steve Christoff made the WCHA Second Team.

The 1978–79 Minnesota team joined the 1948–49 Boston College Eagles as the only teams to win a championship with all of their players having been born in one state or province and was the second time Minnesota had won a championship with only American players. Two Gophers were taken in the 1979 NHL Entry Draft with both (Mike Ramsey and Neal Broten) becoming All-Stars.

Head Coach Herb Brooks would leave Minnesota that summer when he signed on to serve as the bench boss for the US National Team at the 1980 Winter Olympics. Unsurprisingly, Brooks drew heavily from the program he ran for seven season with 8 of 20 players coming from the 1979 championship team: Bill Baker, Neal Broten, Steve Christoff, Steve Janaszak, Rob McClanahan, Mike Ramsey, Eric Strobel and Phil Verchota.

Standings

Schedule

|-
!colspan=12 style="color:white; background:#862334; " | Exhibition

|-
!colspan=12 style="color:white; background:#862334; " | Regular Season

|-
!colspan=12 style="color:white; background:#862334; " | 

|- align="center" bgcolor="#e0e0e0"
|colspan=12|Minnesota Wins Series 11-4

|- align="center" bgcolor="#e0e0e0"
|colspan=12|Minnesota Wins Series 8-4
|-
!colspan=12 style="color:white; background:#862334; " |

Roster and scoring statistics

Goaltending statistics

1979 championship game

(W1) North Dakota vs. (W2) Minnesota

Players drafted into the NHL

1979 NHL Entry Draft

References

Minnesota Golden Gophers men's ice hockey seasons
Minnesota
Minnesota
Minnesota
Minnesota
Minnesota
Minnesota